Chondrolepis ducarmei is a species of butterfly in the family Hesperiidae. It is found in the Democratic Republic of the Congo and is endemic to the Albertine Rift. The habitat consists of submontane areas.

References

Insects described in 2012
Hesperiinae